The Community College Survey of Student Engagement (CCSSE) (pronounced: sessie) provides data and analysis about student engagement in community colleges.  Like its counterpart in four-year institutions, the National Survey of Student Engagement (NSSE), the CCSSE survey instrument is used to gauge the level of student engagement in college.  The survey is administered to community college students during the spring academic term.  The survey questions assess institutional practices and student behaviors that are correlated highly with student learning and student retention.

The survey serves three purposes for community college administrators and instructors:
 benchmarking—comparison to national norms on educational practice and performance by community and technical colleges. 
 diagnosis—identification of areas in which an institution could improve students’ educational experiences and outcomes. 
 monitoring/accountability—documentation and improvement of institutional effectiveness over time.

The CCSSE survey instrument was first piloted in 2001. From 2002 through 2010, more than 1,770,000 students at 754 community colleges in 49 U.S. states, British Columbia, Nova Scotia and the Marshall Islands participated in the survey. CCSSE is a product and service of the Center for Community College Student Engagement (CCCSE), which is part of the Program for Higher Education Leadership in the Department of Educational Leadership and Policy at The University of Texas at Austin. CCCSE's director is Linda García, Ph.D.

See also 
 Undergraduate education

External links 
 Survey instrument website
 Center for Community College Student Engagement (CCCSE) official website
 IPEDS

Community colleges